Grace Evangelical Church of Vader (also known as Grace United Methodist Church of Vader) is a historic Methodist church in Vader, Washington.

The Gothic style building was constructed in 1902 and added to the National Register of Historic Places in 2003.

References

Methodist churches in Washington (state)
Buildings and structures in Lewis County, Washington
Churches on the National Register of Historic Places in Washington (state)
Gothic Revival church buildings in Washington (state)
Churches completed in 1902
National Register of Historic Places in Lewis County, Washington